Madhesara is a village in the Sitamarhi district of Bihar state, India.

This village is known for its traditional values and ponds. This village is situated at around 2.5 km from NH-77.

There is an old Shiva temple in the nearby village named Madhiya.

Chhapkahiya is a site in the village which said to have been created by a ghost and which belongs to "Madhesara Darbar".

References

Villages in Sitamarhi district